The Battle of Hansan Island and following engagement at Angolpo took place on 8 July 1592. In two naval encounters, Korean Admiral Yi Sun-sin's fleet managed to destroy roughly 100 Japanese ships and halted Japanese naval operations along the southern coast.

Background
Yi Eok-gi joined with Yi Sun-sin at Yeosu on 10 August. On 12 August, they rendezvoused with Won Gyun at Noryang, bringing their total fleet strength to 56 warships. At Dangpo, they received news of a Japanese fleet sailing west from Busan. Wakizaka Yasuharu’s fleet of 73 ships entered Gyeonnaeryang.

Battle
On 8 July, Yi Sun-sin's fleet encountered a Japanese scout vessel and gave chase but broke off after sighting a large fleet of Japanese warships in Gyonnaeryang Strait. Yi Sun-sin sent a small detachment forward to lure the Japanese fleet, and they took the bait, following them into open waters off Hansando Island. The Korean fleet assumed a U-shaped crane formation with large warships in the center and lighter ships on its wings. The two fleets engaged in battle and the Japanese ships were destroyed while their weapons did nothing to the Korean ships. The battle lasted throughout the day until the Koreans tired from chasing and returned to open sea. Fourteen Japanese ships that had not engaged in combat escaped, the rest were destroyed. Wakizaka Yasuharu managed to withdraw to Gimhae.

News of the Japanese defeat reached Busan within hours and two Japanese commanders, Kuki Yoshitaka and Kato Yoshiaki, immediately set sail with 42 ships for the port of Angolpo, where they hoped to face the Korean fleet close to shore.

Yi Sun-sin received news of their movements on 15 August and he advanced towards Angolpo to confront them. This time the Japanese were unwilling to follow the Koreans into open water and stayed onshore. They would not take the bait. In response the Korean fleet moved forwards and bombarded the anchored Japanese fleet for hours until they retreated inland. Later the Japanese returned and escaped on small boats. Both Kuki and Kato survived the battle.

Aftermath
Won Gyun was left behind to mop up Japanese soldiers marooned on a small isle, but fled after receiving a false report of a large Japanese fleet approaching. The Japanese managed to drift to shore using rafts made from the wreckage of their ships.

On 23 August, Hideyoshi Toyotomi ordered naval commander Todo Takatora to reinforce operations in Korea and halted naval operations at Busan.

International recognition
George Alexander Ballard (1862–1948), a vice admiral of British Royal Navy, complimented Admiral Yi's winning streaks by the Battle of Hansando highly:

 "This was the great Korean admiral's crowning exploit. In the short space of six weeks [actually about 9 weeks, May 7, 1592 – July 7, 1592] he had achieved a series of successes unsurpassed in the whole annals of maritime war, destroying the enemy's battle fleets, cutting his [Hideyoshi's] lines of communication, sweeping up his convoys, imperilling the situation of his victorious armies in the field, and bringing his ambitious schemes to utter ruin. Not even Nelson, Blake, or Jean Bart could have done more than this scarcely known representative of a small and cruelly oppressed nation; and it is to be regretted that his memory lingers nowhere outside his native land, for no impartial judge could deny him the right to be accounted among the born leaders of men."

Historians Hulbert also admired the naval battle, evaluating it as follows.

 "This is the Battle of Salamis in Joseon. This naval battle is the death sentence for Toyotomi's invasion of Joseon."

In popular culture
The battle is depicted in the 2022 film Hansan: Rising Dragon directed by Kim Han-min.

References

Bibliography

 
 
 
 
 
 
 
 
 
 
 桑田忠親 [Kuwata, Tadachika], ed., 舊參謀本部編纂, [Kyu Sanbo Honbu], 朝鮮の役 [Chousen no Eki]　(日本の戰史 [Nihon no Senshi] Vol. 5), 1965.

See also
The Four Campaigns of Admiral Yi during the Imjin Year (1592)
Siege of Jinju (1592)
Battle of Haengju
Battle of Myeongnyang

Naval battles of the Japanese invasions of Korea (1592–1598)
1592 in Asia
1592 in Japan
Conflicts in 1592
Yi Sun-sin